Noah was the name of the first cloned gaur. He was cloned and gestated in the womb of a cow named Bessie. Gaurs are listed as a vulnerable species on the IUCN Red List. Noah was delivered on January 8, 2001, but he died within just 48 hours of dysentery on January 10, 2001. Noah's condition was monitored by Dr. Jonathan Hill and his teammates in Iowa. The process used to clone Noah was nuclear transfer.

References

 BBC News. 2000. Website. Endangered species cloned. BBC. Retrieved May 31, 2008.
 CNN.com. 2001. Website. First cloned endangered species dies 2 days after birth. CNN.com. Retrieved May 31, 2008

2001 animal births
2001 animal deaths
Cloned animals